Two ships of the Royal Navy have been named HMS Ashanti after the Ashanti people.

  was a  destroyer launched in 1937 and sold for breaking up in 1949.
  was a  frigate launched in 1959. She was expended as a target in 1988.

Royal Navy ship names